The 1934 United States Senate election in Mississippi was held on November 6, 1934. Incumbent Senator Hubert Stephens ran for re-election to a third term, but was defeated by Governor Theodore Bilbo in a close run-off election.

On August 28, Stephens won the Democratic primary over Bilbo and Meridian Congressman Ross Collins in a close three-way race. Since no candidate received a majority of the vote, the election proceeded to a run-off between Stephens and Bilbo. On September 18, Bilbo won the run-off by just 7,115 votes.

Bilbo won the November general election without an opponent.

Democratic primary

Candidates
Theodore Bilbo, former Governor of Mississippi
Ross A. Collins, U.S. Representative from Meridian
Frank H. Harper, Hattiesburg resident
Hubert Stephens, incumbent Senator

Results

Primary runoff

Results

General election

References

1934
Mississippi
United States Senate
Single-candidate elections